Milan Makarić (born 4 October 1995) is a Serbian professional footballer who plays as a forward for Radnik Surdulica, on loan from Danish club AaB.

Playing style
He started off in a central midfield role early in his career, before being moved into centre-forward position in which he now usually plays.

Career statistics

External links
 
 

1995 births
Living people
Serbian footballers
Serbian expatriate footballers
Footballers from Novi Sad
Association football midfielders
Association football forwards
Serbia youth international footballers
Serbia international footballers
FK Vojvodina players
FK Proleter Novi Sad players
FK Spartak Subotica players
OFK Bačka players
FK Zvijezda 09 players
FK Radnički Niš players
FK Radnik Surdulica players
AaB Fodbold players
Serbian First League players
Serbian SuperLiga players
Danish Superliga players
Serbian expatriate sportspeople in Denmark
Expatriate footballers in Denmark